Professor Dame Joan Kathleen Stringer, DBE, FRSE, FRSA (born 12 May 1948) is a British political scientist and former Principal and Vice-Chancellor of Edinburgh Napier University and Queen Margaret University, Edinburgh.

Biography

Education
Stringer attended Portland House High School, Stoke-on-Trent, and Stoke-on-Trent College of Art. She then went to Keele University, where she took a B.A. degree with joint honours in History and Politics and completed a Ph.D degree in Politics in 1986.

Career
From 1980-88, she worked at Robert Gordon's Institute of Technology, Aberdeen as a lecturer in Public Administration, becoming in 1988 the Head of the School of Public Administration and Law, and served as Vice-Principal from 1991-96.

In 1996, she was named Principal and Vice-Patron of Queen Margaret College (QMUC) in Edinburgh. Her time at the College saw much expansion, and in 1998, the College was awarded full degree-awarding powers, changing its name in 1999 to Queen Margaret University College (QMUC). Dame Joan laid the foundations for the University College to become Queen Margaret University, Edinburgh. 

Stringer left Queen Margaret University College in 2003 to become Principal/Vice-Chancellor of Napier University.

In 2009, Stringer oversaw Napier University's change of name to Edinburgh Napier University in a bid to raise the institution's profile. In 2010-11, Professor Stringer oversaw a programme of redundancies at Edinburgh Napier University which resulted in 89 staff taking voluntary severance and a further anticipated 100 staff being dismissed on the grounds of compulsory redundancy.

Stringer has held a number of appointments outside of academia, including Chair of the Northern Ireland Equality Commission Working Group from 1998–1999, Lay Member of the Judicial Appointments Board for Scotland from 2002–07, Senior Independent Director of the Institute of Directors, Member of the Executive Committee for the Scottish Council for Development and Industry, Chair of Education UK Scotland, Chair of Community Integrated Care, Convenor of the Scottish Council for Voluntary Organisations, and trustee of the David Hume Institute. 

She is currently Chair of Capital Theatres in Edinburgh and a board member of Entrepreneurial Scotland.

Honours
Stringer was appointed Commander of the Order of the British Empire (CBE) in 2001, and promoted to Dame Commander of the Order of the British Empire (DBE) in the 2009 Birthday Honours.

 
In 2001, she was elected a Fellow of The Royal Society of Edinburgh. She is also a Companion of the Chartered Institute of Management and a Fellow of the Royal Society of Arts.

References

External links
 British Council website

1948 births
Academics of Edinburgh Napier University
Alumni of Keele University
British political scientists
Dames Commander of the Order of the British Empire
People associated with Queen Margaret University
People from Stoke-on-Trent
Living people
Fellows of the Royal Society of Edinburgh
Academics of Robert Gordon University
Women political scientists